Harton may refer to:
Harton, North Yorkshire, a village and civil parish in North Yorkshire, England
Harton, Shropshire, a hamlet in the parish of Eaton-under-Heywood, Shropshire, England
Harton, South Shields, a settlement in South Tyneside, Tyne and Wear, England
Harton, Devon, a former name of the town of Hartland in Devon, England
West Harton, South Shields

See also 
 Hatton (disambiguation)